The discography of American rapper Too Short.

Albums

Solo studio albums

Collaborative albums

Compilation albums

Extended plays

Mixtapes

Video albums

Singles

As lead artist

As featured artist

Other charted songs

Guest appearances

Notes

References

External links
 Official website
 Too $hort at AllMusic
 
 

Hip hop discographies
Discographies of American artists